Dylan is a greatest hits album by American singer-songwriter Bob Dylan. The collection was released on October 2, 2007 by Columbia Records and Legacy Recordings with worldwide distribution through Sony BMG. It was released as a single-disc CD and a three-disc Deluxe Edition (containing 51 songs), which was released as a digipack and a box set presented in replica-vinyl packaging, along with 10 postcards and an extensive booklet.
The Deluxe Edition includes the 1971 version of "You Ain't Goin' Nowhere" although the album's liner notes erroneously state that it is the 1967 version.

Track listings 
All songs were written by Bob Dylan, except where noted.

Standard edition

Deluxe edition

Charts and certifications

References

External links 
 Dylan Standard Edition at Legacy Recordings.com
 Box set track listing revealed at Uncut.co.uk

2007 greatest hits albums
Albums produced by Barry Beckett
Albums produced by Bob Dylan
Albums produced by Bob Johnston
Albums produced by Daniel Lanois
Albums produced by Don DeVito
Albums produced by Jerry Wexler
Albums produced by John Hammond (producer)
Albums produced by Leon Russell
Albums produced by Mark Knopfler
Albums produced by Rob Fraboni
Albums produced by Tom Wilson (record producer)
Bob Dylan compilation albums
Columbia Records compilation albums
Legacy Recordings compilation albums